Montmain is a commune in the Seine-Maritime department in the Normandy region in north-western France.

Geography

Population

Places of interest
 The church of St.Nicolas, dating from the eighteenth century.
 Some ruined feudal walls and terracing.

See also
Communes of the Seine-Maritime department

References

External links

Official commune website 

Communes of Seine-Maritime